Ammons is a surname. Notable people with the surname include:

Albert Ammons (1907–1949), American jazz pianist
A.R. Ammons (1926–2001), American author and poet
Cliff Ammons (1918–1981), Louisiana state representative
Donalda Ammons (born 1953), American educator and writer
Doug Ammons (born 1957), American adventurer, kayaker, psychologist, and author
Elizabeth Ammons, American literary scholar
Gene Ammons (1925–1974), American jazz saxophonist
Elias M. Ammons (1860–1925), Governor of Colorado
Jane Ammons (born 1953), American industrial engineer
Robert B. Ammons (1920–1999), American psychologist